Georges Schoucair is a prominent Lebanese film producer. Considered as one of the most promising film producers in the Middle-East cinema, Schoucair has produced several critically acclaimed and award-winning independent movies. He has actively contributed to the development of cinema in Lebanon as well as African cinema.

He is the founder and CEO of his own production house, 'Abbout Productions' founded in 2003. However, the company was originally established in 1998 by Joana Hadjithomas and Khalil Joreige.  Apart from that, he is also the founder of Maskoon Fantastic Film Festival in Beirut, regarded as the first genre movie film fest in the Arab world.

Career
As a producer, he worked with award-winning directors including: Kaouther Ben Hania, Vatche Boulghourjian, Jean Luc Godard, Alain Gomis, Joana Hadjithomas, Annemarie Jacir, Khalil Joreige, Mohammad Malas, Lucrecia Martel, Shirin Neshat, Asli Ozge, Rafi Pitts, Bill Plympton, Ghassan Salhab, Elia Suleiman and Apichatpong Weerasethakul.

Apart from Abbout Productions, Schoucair co-founded indie film company 'MC Distribution'. Since 2008, he is also the vice-president of the only art house cinema in Beirut: 'Metropolis'. He is considered as founding figure in indie film company 'Schortcut Films' in 2016 where he worked as the producer in many acclaimed films Félicité (2017), Wajib (2017), Rafiki (2018), Beauty & The Dogs (2018), It Must Be Heaven (2019) and A Son (2019).

Filmography

See also
 Cinema of Lebanon

References

External links
 
 My Working From Home Life: Lebanese producer Georges Schoucair

Living people
Lebanese film producers
Year of birth missing (living people)